Anna Ragsdale Camp (born September 27, 1982) is an American actress and singer. She is best known for her roles as the villainous Sarah Newlin in the HBO vampire drama True Blood (2009, 2013–2014) and Aubrey Posen in the musical comedy Pitch Perfect film series (2012–2017).

Camp had recurring roles in the television series Mad Men (2010), The Good Wife (2011–2016), The Mindy Project (2012–2013), and Vegas (2013). She also played Jane Hollander, a researcher for the fictitious News of the Week magazine, in the Amazon Prime series Good Girls Revolt (2016), and had minor roles in the drama The Help (2011) and the Woody Allen film Café Society (2016).

Camp made her Broadway debut in the 2008 production of The Country Girl and played Jill Mason in the 2008 Broadway revival of Peter Shaffer's Equus. In 2012, she was nominated for a Drama Desk Award for her performance in the Off-Broadway play All New People.

Early life
Camp was born in Aiken, South Carolina. Her mother, Dee (née Kornegay), is a Democratic Party volunteer, and her father, Thomas Sewell Camp, is a bank executive. She has an older sister, Saluda.

Camp is of British (English, Scottish, and Welsh), Dutch, French and Swedish descent, and grew up in Columbia, South Carolina. She attended Meadowfield Elementary School and was cast in a Drug Abuse Resistance Education production in the second grade, introducing her to acting. She graduated from the University of North Carolina School of the Arts with a Bachelor of Fine Arts degree in 2004. She moved to New York City shortly thereafter.

Career
Camp played the role of Perfect in columbinus in 2005. In 2007, she was nominated for a Lucille Lortel Award for her performance in the off-Broadway play The Scene. She played Jill Mason in the 2008 Broadway revival of Equus at the Broadhurst Theatre, which starred Daniel Radcliffe as Alan Strang. Speaking about the role, Camp said, "I had a lot of thought; I didn't even know if I was going to do Equus because of the nudity and because of the high profile [aspect] of it. But you only live once and you have to take those risks because you'll only be a better person or actor because of it."

She appeared in Reinventing the Wheelers, a 2007 television pilot which was not ordered to series by ABC. In 2008, she had a role in the pilot of the ABC television dramedy Cashmere Mafia. She had a starring role as Sarah Newlin in the second season of the HBO supernatural drama series True Blood, which earned her a nomination for a SAG Award for Outstanding Performance by an Ensemble in a Drama Series; Camp had earlier auditioned for the role of Sookie Stackhouse.

Camp has made guest appearances on The Office (2009), Glee (2009), Numbers (2010), and Covert Affairs (2010). She has had recurring roles in the fourth season of the AMC drama series Mad Men (2010) and the third season of the CBS legal drama series The Good Wife (2011–2012) and How I Met Your Mother (2013).

In 2011, Camp starred in the premiere of All New People, a play written by Zach Braff and staged at Second Stage Theatre; the production was directed by Peter Dubois and also starred Justin Bartha, David Wilson Barnes and Krysten Ritter.

Camp was a member of the main cast in the first season of Fox sitcom The Mindy Project, and played Aubrey Posen in the 2012 musical comedy film Pitch Perfect, later reprising her role in the sequels Pitch Perfect 2 and Pitch Perfect 3.

She had a recurring role in Netflix's Unbreakable Kimmy Schmidt as Deirdre Robespierre and starred with Nasim Pedrad in Desperados.

Personal life
Camp was engaged to actor Michael Mosley by September 2008; they married in 2010 and filed for divorce in 2013. Camp began dating Pitch Perfect co-star Skylar Astin in 2013. The couple were reported to be engaged in January 2016. They married on September 10, 2016. On April 19, 2019, the couple announced that they were filing for divorce. As of late-August that year, the divorce was finalized.

Filmography

Film

Television

Web

Music videos

Soundtrack appearances 
 Pitch Perfect (2012)
 Pitch Perfect 2 (2015)
Pitch Perfect 3 (2017)

Awards and nominations

References

External links 

 
 
 
 

1982 births
Living people
Actresses from New York City
American film actresses
American stage actresses
American television actresses
University of North Carolina School of the Arts alumni
People from Aiken, South Carolina
Musicians from Columbia, South Carolina
21st-century American actresses
Actresses from Columbia, South Carolina